Beguni is a common Bengali snack originating from the Bengal region. It is made of eggplant (also known as aubergine or brinjal) which is sliced and dipped in gram flour batter before being either fried or deep fried in oil. This dish is also popular in eastern Indian states of Assam and Tripura. A similar European dish is known as aubergine fritters. An almost identical dish is made in the Caribbean, namely in Trinidad and Tobago and Guyana, called baiganee, consisting of sliced eggplant battered in pholourie batter.

The dish may be prepared by coating eggplant with besan paste and then frying the pieces in oil. The eggplant is usually cut longitudinally  ( begun) and dipped in a batter of Bengal gram flour with salt and turmeric, and deep-fried in mustard oil.

See also
 Bengali cuisine
 Piyaji

References

Bengali cuisine
Deep fried foods
Bangladeshi snack foods
Eggplant dishes